A Palestinian terrorist attack on Sbarro, a pizzeria in downtown Jerusalem, took place on 9 August 2001, in which 15 civilians were killed, including 7 children and a pregnant woman, and 130 wounded.

Attack
At the time of the bombing, the Jerusalem branch of the Sbarro pizza restaurant chain was located at the corner of King George Street and Jaffa Road in Jerusalem, one of the busiest pedestrian crossings in the region. Although not required to do so, owner Noam Amar added extra support columns on the advice of city inspectors.

Ahlam Tamimi, who was charged as an accomplice, scouted for a target before leading Izz al-Din Shuheil al-Masri, the suicide bomber, to the Sbarro restaurant. They arrived just before 2:00 pm, when the restaurant was filled with customers, "dozens of women, children and babies", and pedestrian traffic outside was at its peak. Tamimi departed before Al-Masri, thought to be carrying a rigged guitar case or wearing an explosive belt weighing 5 to 10 kilograms, containing explosives, nails, nuts and bolts, detonated his bomb.

The dead included 13 Israelis, one pregnant American, and one Brazilian, all of them civilians. Additionally, 130 were injured. One victim, Chana Nachenberg, remains hospitalized, in a permanent vegetative state, more than twenty years after the attack. She was 31 years old at the time of the bombing. Her daughter, who was 2 years old at the time, was one of the few in the restaurant who came through the disaster unscathed.

Yocheved Shoshan, age 10, was killed, and her 15-year-old sister Miriam was severely injured with 60 nails lodged in her body, a hole in her right thigh, third degree burns on 40 percent of her body, and a ruptured spleen. According to the testimony of their mother, Esther Shoshan:

Mordechai and Tzira Schijveschuurder, both children of Holocaust survivors, were killed along with three of their children. Two other daughters, Leah, 11, and Chaya, 8, were critically injured. The family was Dutch. During the Holocaust, Tzira's parents were in Bergen Belsen and Theresienstadt. Mordechai's parents successfully hid from the Nazis.

According to the testimony of Chaya Schijveschuurder:

Chaviv Avrahami, who saw the scene of the attack after the bombing, recounted: "I heard a tremendous explosion, and I was thrown up a metre into the air. I knew immediately that it was a bomb attack, and a catastrophic one. There were people – babies – thrown through the window and covered with blood. The whole street was covered with blood and bodies: the dead and the dying." Naor Shara, a soldier who witnessed the attack, said, "The worst thing I saw, which I think will haunt me all my life, is a baby that was sitting in a stroller outside a shop and was dead. After the explosion, the baby's mother came out of the store and started screaming hysterically."

Perpetrators

Both Hamas and the Islamic Jihad Movement in Palestine initially claimed responsibility, with Hamas saying that the attack was in response to Israel's assassination ten days earlier in Nablus of the two leading Hamas commanders Jamal Mansour and Omar Mansour as well as six civilians including two children.

The suicide bomber who died in the course of carrying out the attack was later identified to be Izz al-Din Shuheil al-Masri from the Palestinian West Bank town of Aqabah. Izz al-Masri was 22 at the time and the son of a successful restaurant owner, and from an affluent land-owning family.

The person who constructed the explosives was a man named as Abdallah Barghouti. For his part in the bombing and a string of other attacks, in which 67 civilians were killed and 500 injured, he was handed down 67 life sentences on 30 November 2004.

Ahlam Tamimi

Izz al-Masri was escorted to the restaurant by Ahlam Tamimi, a 20-year-old female university student and part-time journalist, who had disguised herself as a Jewish tourist for the occasion. She later commented that she was not sorry for what she had done and does not recognize Israel's existence. "Despite the fact that I'm sentenced to 16 life sentences I know that we will become free from Israeli occupation and then I will also be free from the prison," she said. When she first learned from a journalist who was interviewing her in jail that she had murdered eight children, not just three as she had initially believed, she just smiled broadly and continued with the interview.

Tamimi was released in October 2011 in exchange for the release of captive Israeli soldier Gilad Shalit.

In an interview which aired on Al-Aqsa TV on 12 July 2012 (as translated by MEMRI), Tamimi described the reaction of other Palestinians immediately after the bombing:

After hearing an initial report that "three people were killed" in the bombing, Tamimi stated:

Impact
The shock of this incident inspired the Belzberg family to establish the ONE Family Fund, a charity that provides assistance to victims of terrorist attacks targeting Israel.

Official reactions
In response to the attack, Israel shut down the unofficial Palestinian "foreign office" in Jerusalem, at the Orient House. Foreign Minister Peres said that "If the Palestinian Authority had acted with the necessary determination and carried out preventive detentions of Hamas terrorists and their operators, the murders today in Jerusalem would have been prevented."

Within the Palestinian Territories, Hamas claimed responsibility for the bombing which it praised as a "retaliation of the Palestinian people" against Israel. President of the Palestine Liberation Organization and of the Palestinian Authority Yasser Arafat condemned the "bombing attack ... in West Jerusalem and I denounce all acts that harm civilians." but the Palestinian Authority blamed Israeli prime minister Ariel Sharon for provoking the attack and stated it held him "fully responsible for what happened. The assassinations, the killings and the terrorism that he has practised and escalated in recent weeks led to this result."

U.S. President George W. Bush expressed condolences and stated, "I deplore and strongly condemn the terrorist bombing in downtown Jerusalem today. My heartfelt sympathies and those of the American people are with the victims of this terrible tragedy and their families." Bush demanded Arafat to "condemn this horrific terrorist attack, act now to arrest and bring to justice those responsible, and take immediate, sustained action to prevent future terrorist attacks."

According to the U.N. press release, "UN Secretary-General Kofi Annan condemned today's terror attack by a suicide bomber in Jerusalem. He deplored all acts of terror and is deeply disturbed by the terrible loss of life." According to the Belgian EU Presidency, "The Presidency of the European Union unreservedly condemns the bombing of a Jerusalem shopping centre today, 9 August. It abhors this cowardly act which mainly claimed the lives of innocent civilians."

Palestinian exhibit
After the suicide bombing, Palestinian university students at the An-Najah University in the West Bank city of Nablus created an exhibition celebrating the first anniversary of the Second Intifada. The exhibit's main attraction was a room-sized re-enactment of the bombing at Sbarro. The installation featured broken furniture splattered with fake blood and human body parts. The entrance to the exhibition was illustrated with a mural depicting the bombing. The exhibit was later shut down by Palestinian leader Yasser Arafat.

Response and activism of victims' families
In 2001, the family of Malka Chana (Malki) Roth, a 15-year-old victim of the attack, founded The Malki Foundation, a charity organization that supports families of children with disabilities. All services and equipment are provided at no cost to the families. People of all religions and backgrounds are eligible for assistance. The organization is a memorial to Malka Roth's life. Later, Malka's parents, Arnold and Frimet Roth, participated in a mass protest in Europe alongside the families of other terror victims in support of the legality the Israeli West Bank barrier. Arnold remarked, "Do I feel bad about the destruction the fence is causing? I do. But do not compare the murder of my daughter to the inability of a Palestinian to get to work by 9:00 A.M."

The husband of Shoshana Greenbaum, the pregnant woman killed in the attack, responded by organizing a group called "Partners in Kindness" and writing a column called "A Daily Dose of Kindness". He explained that he made these efforts in attempt to "improve the world".

2011 prisoner exchange
During the 2011 Gilad Shalit prisoner exchange, relatives of the victims of the bombing vehemently protested the release of Ahlam Tamimi, who chose the Sbarro restaurant as a target and drove the bomber to the location.

Arnold and Frimet Roth circulated a petition against Tamimi's inclusion in the Gilad Shalit prisoner exchange and also wrote a letter to Prime Minister Binyamin Netanyahu urging him to exclude her from the list. Frimet Roth said in October, "We feel desperate. We beg Mr. Netanyahu to grant us a few minutes of his time and hear us out. In any sane country with a fair judicial system, even paroled murderers are not released without granting the victims' loved ones a chance to address the parole board."
 
Chaya Schijveschuurder, whose parents and three siblings were killed in the attack, protested with a sign that read, "My parents' blood screams from the grave!" Her brother, Shvuel, vandalized the Yitzhak Rabin memorial and commented, "My opinions are all right compared to [Chaya's] and compared to how she feels about the deal. She was badly wounded in the [Sbarro] attack, she feels that releasing the terrorist is as if she were raped and then the rapist went and murdered her parents and is now being released. For her it's like being raped twice."

See also

 List of massacres committed during the Al-Aqsa Intifada
 List of Hamas suicide attacks
 List of Palestinian suicide attacks
 Palestinian political violence
 Malki Foundation
 Israeli casualties of war
 List of massacres in Israel

References

External links
 Suicide bombing at the Sbarro pizzeria in Jerusalem – Israeli MFA (with pictures)
 The Malki Foundation. Last accessed 9 August 2006
 Partners In Kindness. Last accessed 9 August 2006
 Gruesome exhibit marks anniversary of uprising. The Associated Press, 24 September 2001. Last accessed 9 August 2006
 Arafat closes 'suicide bombing' art show. BBC News. 26 September 2001. Last accessed 9 August 2006
 Photos of the murdered victims

Suicide bombings in 2001
2001 murders in Asia
August 2001 crimes
August 2001 events in Asia
Israeli casualties in the Second Intifada
Terrorist incidents in Jerusalem
Mass murder in 2001
Islamic Jihad Movement in Palestine
2001 in Jerusalem
Attacks on restaurants in Asia
Al-Qassam Brigades Operations
Hamas suicide bombings
Islamic terrorist incidents in 2001
Terrorist incidents in Jerusalem in the 2000s